The Weldon School of Biomedical Engineering is Purdue University's school of biomedical engineering. The school offers a B.S. undergraduate degree, M.S. and Ph.D. graduate degrees, and an integrated M.D./Ph.D. degree in a partnership with the Indiana University School of Medicine as part of the Medical Scientist Training Program of the National Institutes of Health.

History
In 1974, Hillenbrand Biomedical Engineering Center was created. The Center was headed by Dr. Leslie A. Geddes and located in Purdue's A.A. Potter Engineering Center. In 1998, the Hillenbrand Biomedical Engineering Center was elevated in status to the Department of Biomedical Engineering within the College of Engineering at Purdue. George R. Wodicka was the department's founding head.  After a generous $10 million donation by Norman Weldon, an alumnus of Purdue, and his family, the department was formally expanded into a school of biomedical engineering.  The donation provided for hiring additional faculty, research initiatives and other start-up costs. In honor of Weldon's donation, the school is named the Weldon School of Biomedical Engineering.  

In 2006, the Weldon School moved from Potter Center to a new Biomedical Engineering Building on Purdue's campus. The building was renamed the Martin C. Jischke Hall of Biomedical Engineering after the former president of Purdue University. 

Dr. Geddes remained on staff as a Professor Emeritus until his death in 2009. George R. Wodicka is the head of the School.

Research areas
The Weldon School of Biomedical Engineering focuses research in four signature areas.
 Engineered Biomaterials and Biomechanics
 Imaging
 Instrumentation
 Quantitative Cellular & Systems Engineering

Degrees offered

Undergraduate
 Bachelor of Science in Biomedical Engineering (BSBME)

Graduate

PhD Options
 Biomedical Engineering PhD (post-BS or post-MS options)
 Interdisciplinary Biomedical Sciences PhD
 Combined Clinical MD-PhD BME (MSTP; partnership with IUSM)
 Bioengineering Interdisciplinary Training in Diabetes Research Program (BTDR)
 Interdisciplinary Training Program in Auditory Neuroscience (TPAN)

MS Options
 MS Biomedical Engineering (MS BME, with thesis)
 Fifth-Year Combined BS/MS in Biomedical Engineering (thesis option)
 Fifth-Year Combined BS/MS Professional Master's (coursework only)
 MS BME Professional Master's (coursework only)
 Concurrent MS BME and MBA
 Combined MS BME and MD
 MSE/MS with Concentration in Biomedical Engineering

Facilities
In 2006, Purdue University opened a new facility for the Weldon School of Biomedical Engineering. The building cost $25 million and was financed in part by grants from the Whitaker Foundation and the State of Indiana. The building is located in Purdue's Discovery Park near Lynn Hall of Veterinary Medicine, Birck Nanotechnology Center, Burton D. Morgan Center for Entrepreneurship, Bindley Bioscience Center, and Lilly Hall of Life Sciences.  The building houses the academic and head offices for the School, learning spaces, research labs, faculty offices, conference rooms, and a computer lab. The facility was expanded in 2019.

References

External links
The Weldon School of Biomedical Engineering
The Center for Implantable Devices in the Weldon School of Biomedical Engineering

Purdue University
West Lafayette, Indiana